Phoebodontiformes is an extinct group of elasmobranchs, known from the Devonian and Carboniferous periods. It includes the genera Phoebodus, Diademodus and Thrinacodus. Phoebodus and Thrinacodus have slender, elongate bodies. Their teeth are tricuspate (bearing three cusps). Jalodus and other members of the family Jalodontidae, which range from the Devonian to the Triassic, were formerly included in this order, but have subsequently been assigned to their own order, the Jalodontiformes.

References 

Prehistoric cartilaginous fish orders
Carboniferous sharks